The Grand Central Public Market is a building in southeast Portland, Oregon. It was added to the National Register of Historic Places in 2006.

See also
 National Register of Historic Places listings in Southeast Portland, Oregon

References

Further reading

External links
 

1929 establishments in Oregon
Buckman, Portland, Oregon
Commercial buildings completed in 1929
Commercial buildings on the National Register of Historic Places in Oregon
Mission Revival architecture in Oregon
Portland Eastside MPS
Spanish Revival architecture in the United States